Northfield Falls is an unincorporated village in the town of Northfield, Washington County, Vermont, United States. Northfield Falls has a post office with ZIP code 05664.

References

Unincorporated communities in Washington County, Vermont
Unincorporated communities in Vermont